"Boum!" (onomatopoeia similar to "boom" in English) is a popular 1938 song by the French singer/songwriter Charles Trenet which won him the Grand Prix du Disque.  Its light, irreverent lyrics express a joie de vivre typical in French popular music produced during the late 1930s, reflecting the political unrest and economic uncertainty of that time.

It includes depictions of the sounds made by various animals and also various onomatopoeia. The lyric to the refrain is:

"Boum!" has been recorded by other artists and in English translation. In 1994 the song was covered by Belgian singer Maurane.

The song has featured in a variety of films and documentaries, including The World at War, Something's Gotta Give, Toto the Hero, Skyfall, and A Good Year. In the BBC TV-series 'Allo 'Allo, Edith Artois often sings it, saying that it is one of her favourites. It has also been used in commercial advertising.

Parody
In Hergé's The Adventures of Tintin comic Land of Black Gold, Trenet's "Boum!" is transformed into a radio advertising jingle for a fictional roadside assistance company, "Simoun"  ("Autocart" in the English editions). In the computer animated film Mortadelo and Filemon: Mission Implausible, Jimmy el Cachondo sings it with an alternative lyric in Spanish.

References

External links
 Lyrics in French

French songs
Charles Trenet songs
Songs written by Charles Trenet
1938 songs